Visby AIK is a Swedish football club located in Visby on the island of Gotland.

Background
Visby AIK currently plays in Division 4 Gotland, sometimes called "Gotlandsfyran", which is the sixth tier of Swedish football. They play their home matches at the Gutavallen arena in Visby.

The club is affiliated to Gotlands Fotbollförbund. Visby AIK have competed in the Svenska Cupen on 25 occasions and have played 37 matches in the competition.

The club were close to earning promotion to the fifth tier, Division 3, and led the Gotland section for a good part of the 2011 season but fell short of the section title by a single goal despite winning their last game of the season 1–0.

Season to season

Footnotes

External links
 Visby AIK – Official website
 Visby AIK – Football website
 Visby AIK on Facebook

Football clubs in Gotland County
Association football clubs established in 1929
1929 establishments in Sweden
Sport in Visby